Bruzus or Brouzos was a town of ancient Phrygia, in the Phrygian Pentapolis, inhabited during Roman and Byzantine times. Druzon, which Ptolemy places among the cities of Phrygia Magna, should be Bruzon.

It was the seat of a bishop; no longer a residential bishopric, it remains a titular see of the Roman Catholic Church.

Its site is located near Karasandıklı in Asiatic Turkey.

References

Populated places in Phrygia
Former populated places in Turkey
Roman towns and cities in Turkey
Populated places of the Byzantine Empire
History of Afyonkarahisar Province
Catholic titular sees in Asia
Sandıklı District